Albert Town is located to the east of Wānaka in Otago, New Zealand. Until recently only a farming settlement, the population boom in this area has led to much new development. The confluence of the Clutha and Hāwea Rivers is located here. The town was named after Prince Albert of Saxe-Coburg and Gotha. Albert Town was formerly called Newcastle.

Demographics

Albert Town had a population of 2,031 at the 2018 New Zealand census, an increase of 744 people (57.8%) since the 2013 census, and an increase of 1,326 people (188.1%) since the 2006 census. There were 687 households. There were 1,020 males and 1,014 females, giving a sex ratio of 1.01 males per female. The median age was 37.3 years (compared with 37.4 years nationally), with 468 people (23.0%) aged under 15 years, 282 (13.9%) aged 15 to 29, 1,080 (53.2%) aged 30 to 64, and 204 (10.0%) aged 65 or older.

Ethnicities were 95.4% European/Pākehā, 6.8% Māori, 0.7% Pacific peoples, 1.9% Asian, and 2.2% other ethnicities (totals add to more than 100% since people could identify with multiple ethnicities).

The proportion of people born overseas was 24.5%, compared with 27.1% nationally.

Although some people objected to giving their religion, 67.8% had no religion, 24.4% were Christian, 0.1% were Hindu, 0.1% were Muslim, 0.3% were Buddhist and 1.9% had other religions.

Of those at least 15 years old, 459 (29.4%) people had a bachelor or higher degree, and 126 (8.1%) people had no formal qualifications. The median income was $41,700, compared with $31,800 nationally. 354 people (22.6%) earned over $70,000 compared to 17.2% nationally. The employment status of those at least 15 was that 945 (60.5%) people were employed full-time, 303 (19.4%) were part-time, and 15 (1.0%) were unemployed.

Education
Te Kura O Take Kārara is a primary school which opened in Albert Town in 2020.

References

Queenstown-Lakes District
Populated places in Otago
Clutha River